Conor Lyne (born 24 February 1993 in Reading, United Kingdom) is an alpine skier from Ireland. He competed for Ireland at the 2014 Winter Olympics in the slalom and giant slalom.

Lyne lives in Utah.

See also
Ireland at the 2014 Winter Olympics

References

External links
Sochi2014 Profile 

1993 births
Living people
Irish male alpine skiers
British expatriates in the United States
Olympic alpine skiers of Ireland
Alpine skiers at the 2014 Winter Olympics
People from Reading, Berkshire